Sergio Suzuki (born 9 October 1994) is a Japanese male taekwondo practitioner of Bolivian descent who mainly competes in flyweight category. He represented Japan at the 2018 Asian Games and claimed a bronze medal in the men's 58kg flyweight event.

Biography 
He was born on 9 October 1994 in Japan to a Japanese father and Bolivian mother before moving to Bolivia at the age of five.

References

External links
 

1994 births
Living people
People from Kawasaki, Kanagawa
Japanese male taekwondo practitioners
Taekwondo practitioners at the 2018 Asian Games
Medalists at the 2018 Asian Games
Asian Games bronze medalists for Japan
Asian Games medalists in taekwondo
Japanese people of Bolivian descent
Taekwondo practitioners at the 2020 Summer Olympics
Olympic taekwondo practitioners of Japan
21st-century Japanese people